LICS may refer to:

 Leeds Industrial Co-operative Society
 LICS (character set), Lotus International Character Set
 LICS (conference), Symposium on Logic in Computer Science
 Liberal and Centre Union (LiCS), a Lithuanian political party
 Logic in computer science, field of logic and computer science

See also
 LIC (disambiguation)